"24 Hours" is a song by Swedish singer Agnes serving as the second single from her fifth studio album Magic Still Exists. It was released on May 21, 2021 through Senga and Universal Music.

Background
Agnes stated about the song: "24 Hours is about going through the fire and the pain. How your life is turned upside down. Something extreme had to happen for you to wake up and see everything clearly. It is a sliding door moment where you choose the path forward.". Simultaneously with the release of the music video, Agnes added: "When we need to process a dramatic change in our life, we go through different stages of emotion. The video for 24 hours [sic] is based on that journey, and the different personalities that it brings to light. All tailored to help us cope with everything from sadness and frustration to anger and grief. It’s not pretty, but without them we wouldn't be rewarded with the powerful energy that then helps us move forward."

"24 Hours" is the second single from Agnes' fifth studio album "Magic Still Exists", that has been released on October 22, 2021.

Music video
A music video was released onto YouTube on July 2nd. The video was directed by SWIM CLUB, which also directed the music video for "Fingers Crossed". 

The music video for "24 Hours" received a nomination in the category "Music Video of the Year" at the 2022 Grammi Awards, which will be held on May 19, 2022.

Track listing
Digital single
"24 Hours" – 4:01

Remixes single
"24 Hours (feat. Andrelli)" (Andrelli Remix) – 2:48

The Circle° Sessions - Single
"24 Hours (The Circle° Sessions)" – 4:22
"Fingers Crossed (The Circle° Sessions)" – 3:23

Credits
All credits retrieved from Discogs
Vocals by Agnes
Backing vocals by Maria Hazell
Composed and written by Agnes, Kerstin Ljungström, Maria Hazell, Salem Al Fakir, Vincent Pontare
Engineered by Colin Leonard, Heidi Wang, Josh Gudwin, Vargas & Lagola
Mastered by Colin Leonard
Mixed by Josh Gudwin, Heidi Wang
Produced by Vargas & Lagola

Charts

Release history

References

2021 songs
Songs written by Salem Al Fakir
2021 singles
Agnes (singer) songs
Songs written by Vincent Pontare
Songs written by Agnes (singer)